Thirunagar may refer to:

 Thirunagar, Madurai, a major urban area near the city of Madurai in South India
 Thirunagar, Erode, a major residential area in the city of Erode in South India